The 2014 Utah State Aggies football team represented Utah State University in the 2014 NCAA Division I FBS football season. The Aggies were led by second-year head coach Matt Wells and played their home games at Merlin Olsen Field at Romney Stadium. This was the Aggies second season as members of the Mountain West Conference in the Mountain Division. They finished the season 10–4, 6–2 in Mountain West play to finish in a tie for second place in the Mountain Division. They were invited to the New Mexico Bowl where they defeated UTEP 21–6.

Before the season

2014 recruits

Blue and White Game
The spring Blue and White Game took place on April 12, 2014. The game came down to a field goal in the last second. (PK) Nick Diaz converted a 39-yard field-goal to give the offense (Blue) the win over the defense (White) 78–77 in the last second.

Departures
Among the notable departures were most of the starting offensive line including four-year starter (C) Tyler Larsen and three-year starter (G) Eric Schultz. The Aggies also lost defensive line coach Frank Maile to Vanderbilt.

NFL Draft

Roster

Schedule

Schedule Source:

Game Summaries

Tennessee
:

Idaho State

Wake Forest

This was the first meeting between the Aggies and the Demon Deacons. The Aggies held the Demon Deacons to −25 yards rushing.

Arkansas State

BYU

Utah State on a crisp day in October, defeated the BYU Cougars. The star quarterback of the BYU team was Taysom Hill, who suffered a broken leg in the 2nd quarter on a hard hit. They beat the Cougars by a score of 35–20. The Cougars were ranked 18 at the time.

Air Force

Colorado State

UNLV

Hawaii

Wyoming

New Mexico

San Jose State

Boise State

UTEP

References

Utah State
Utah State Aggies football seasons
New Mexico Bowl champion seasons
Utah State Aggies football